Eugene Lee is an American businessman based in Palo Alto, California.

Early life
Lee received an A.B. in Physics and an Sc. B. in Engineering and Applied Sciences from Harvard University and an M.S. in management from the MIT Sloan School of Management.

Career
Lee's career spans startups as well as large established companies, but his focus has always been on "the intersection of people, software, and networks".  He was co-founder of Beyond Incorporated, whose BeyondMail product pioneered email filtering and workflow.  Lee was VP and GM of the Messaging Business Unit at Banyan, which acquired Beyond, and then was VP Marketing and Business Development for Banyan's Internet Division, where he launched Switchboard.com, an online white and yellow pages directory.  He moved to California when he was recruited by Cisco Systems as VP Worldwide Small/Medium Business Marketing, and then held assignments as VP Marketing for Cisco's Internet Communications Software Group, and eventually VP Worldwide Enterprise Marketing. From 2004 to 2007 Lee was at Adobe Systems as VP Product Marketing for the Intelligent Documents Business Unit and then as VP Vertical and Solutions Marketing. Lee was named "CEO 2.0" to Socialtext in November 2007.

He went on to found Motiv8 Technologies, dedicated to helping people with behavior change. Its California business registration was suspended in 2019, and returned to "active" status in 2020.  

Lee is also a volunteer and head of a committee that oversees the marketing efforts of the Peninsula Symphony Orchestra, a volunteer community symphony orchestra located in Los Altos, California. He oversees ticket sales, determines marketing direction and brainstorms ways to increase attendance.

He is the holder of 4 patents.

References 

American technology chief executives
Businesspeople from California
Harvard University alumni
MIT Sloan School of Management alumni
Living people
Year of birth missing (living people)